After the Fall of Constantinople to the Ottomans and the following trends of Greek migration to the Diaspora, Greek architecture was concentrated mainly on the Greek Orthodox churches of the Diaspora. These churches, such as other intellectual centres built by Greeks (foundations, schools, etc.), were used also as a meeting-place. The architectural style of these buildings was heavily influenced by the western European architecture.

After the Greek War of Independence and the creation of the modern Greek state, the modern Greek architecture tried to combine the traditional Greek architecture and Greek elements and motives with the western European movements and styles.

The 19th-century architecture of Athens and other cities of the Greek Kingdom is mostly influenced by the Neoclassical architecture, with architects such as  Theophil Hansen, Ernst Ziller, Panagis Kalkos, Lysandros Kaftanzoglou and Stamatios Kleanthis.

History
Architecture was built using bated and phenixes-a special type of grass in Greece mixed in white paste.

The architecture of the modern Greek cities, especially the old centres ("old towns") is mostly influenced either by the Ottoman or the Venetian architecture, two forces that dominated the Greek space from the early modern period.

After the Greek Independence, the modern Greek architects tried to combine traditional Greek and Byzantine elements and motives with the western European movements and styles. Patras was the first city of the modern Greek state to develop a city plan. In January 1829, Stamatis Voulgaris, a Greek engineer of the French army, presented the plan of the new city to the Governor Kapodistrias, who approved it. Voulgaris applied the orthogonal rule in the urban complex of Patras. However his initial plan was modified in 1830.

Two special genres can be considered the Cycladic architecture, featuring whitewashedhouses, in the Cyclades and the Epirotic architecture in the region of Epirus, featuring stone houses.

After the establishment of the Greek Kingdom, the architecture of Athens and other cities was mostly influenced by the Neoclassical architecture. For Athens, the first King of Greece, Otto of Greece, commissioned the architects Stamatios Kleanthis and Eduard Schaubert to design a modern city plan fit for the capital of a state.

Neoclassical examples

In 1917 most of Thessaloniki's old center of the city was destroyed by the Great Thessaloniki Fire of 1917. Following the fire the government prohibited quick rebuilding, so it could implement the new redesign of the city according to the European-style urban plan prepared by a commission of architects headed by French architect Ernest Hébrard.

In 1933 was signed the Athens Charter, a manifesto of the modernist movement which published later by Le Corbusier. Architects of this movement were among others the Bauhaus-architect Ioannis Despotopoulos, Dimitris Pikionis, Patroklos Karantinos and Takis Zenetos.

Antiparochi laws
In 1929, two important laws concerning apartment buildings took effect. The law about "horizontal property" made it possible that many different owners own one apartment building, each by owning one or more apartment units. Theoretically, each apartment corresponds to a percentage of the original plot. The most important effect of this law was the practice of "αντιπαροχή" (antiparochí, literally "a supply in exchange"). With antiparochí, the owner of a plot, who can't afford to build an apartment building by himself, makes a contract with a construction company so that the latter will build the apartment building but keep the ownership of as many apartments as the contract states. Although during the inter-war period the practice of antiparochí was limited, as the construction of most apartment buildings was financed solely by the original owners of the plot, antiparochí became the most common method for financing the construction of condominiums (polykatoikíes) from the 1950s onwards. However this practice had the negative effect of the destruction of many old-era (mostly of 19th century) buildings and mansions in the major Greek cities, to be replaced by common apartment buildings. Even today (2019), the owners of old buildings or mansions, listed as architecturally preserved, prefer to let them collapse to avoid the preservation cost and exploit the plot.

After World War II and the Greek civil war, this practice (the massive construction of condominiums in the major Greek city-centres) was a major contributory factor for the Greek economy and the post-war recovery. The first scycrapers were also constructed during the 1960s and 1970s, such as the OTE Tower and the Athens Tower Complex.

During the 1960s and 1970s, Xenia was a nationwide hotel construction program initiated by the Hellenic Tourism Organisation (Ελληνικός Οργανισμός Τουρισμού, EOT) to improve the country's tourism infrastructure. It constitutes one of the largest infrastructure projects in modern Greek history. The first manager of the project was the architect Charalambos Sfaellos (from 1950 to 1958) and from 1957 the buildings were designed by a team under Aris Konstantinidis.

Famous foreign architects who have also designed buildings in Greece during the 20th and 21st century, include Walter Gropius, Eero Saarinen and Mario Botta. Several new buildings were also constructed by Santiago Calatrava for the 2004 Athens Olympics, while Bernard Tschumi  designed the New Acropolis Museum. Recently in 2012 Renzo Piano designed the Stavros Niarchos Foundation Cultural Center (completed in 2016).

Gallery

See also
 Ancient Greek architecture
 Greek Revival architecture
 Modern architecture in Athens
 Mycenaean Revival architecture

References

External links

Architectural history
Architecture in Greece